Mehdi Sadaghdar (born 13 January 1977), also known on YouTube as ElectroBOOM, is an Iranian-Canadian YouTuber, electrical engineer, and comedian.

Early life
Sadaghdar was born in Iran on 13 January 1977 and resides in Vancouver, British Columbia, Canada. He was conferred a Bachelor of Applied Science from the University of Tehran in 1999 and, after moving to Vancouver, a Master of Applied Science from Simon Fraser University in 2006.

Career
Sadaghdar's videos are mainly focused around comedic electronics tutorials and education. He intentionally creates situations where a shock (or sometimes a fire) occurs for comedic effect, demonstrating the dangers of electricity when not properly handled. His most viewed video has over 19 million views, "How NOT to make an electric guitar", which demonstrates the hazards of electricity.

References

External links

Iranian emigrants to Canada
Canadian YouTubers
Canadian electrical engineers
University of Tehran alumni
Simon Fraser University alumni
1977 births
Living people
English-language YouTube channels
Science-related YouTube channels